Clathrospora is a genus of fungi in the family Diademaceae. The widespread genus contains five species.

References

Pleosporales
Taxa named by Gottlob Ludwig Rabenhorst
Taxa described in 1857
Dothideomycetes genera